Belgium chose their Junior Eurovision entry for 2006 through Eurosong for Kids, a national final consisting of 10 songs competing over two semi-finals and a final. The winner of Junior Eurosong was Thor!, with the song "Een tocht door het donker".

Before Eurovision

Eurosong for Kids 2006 
Eurosong for Kids was the national final for Belgium at the Junior Eurovision Song Contest 2006, organised by Belgian broadcaster Vlaamse Radio- en Televisieomroep (VRT).

Format 
The format of the competition consisted of three shows: two semi-finals and a final. In all shows, the results were based on the votes from a three-member adult "expert" jury, a kids jury, Radio 2 jury, Radio Donna jury and televoting. The televote counted for 1/3 of the overall vote, with the other 4 juries counting for 1/6. The members of the "expert" jury were Els De Schepper, Heidi Lenaerts and Ronny Mosuse. The winning song from each semi-final qualified for the final along with the 3 overall best scoring non-winners.

Semi-final 
The first semi-final took place on 17 September 2006. Thor! advanced directly for the final, winning the semi-final with 70 points. Lizz@xy and Attic also qualified as two of the three overall best scoring non-winners with 67 and 60 points respectively.

Semi-final 2
The second semi-final took place on 24 September 2006. The Fireflies advanced directly for the final, winning the semi-final with 71 points. Nicolas also qualified as one of the three overall best scoring non-winners with 62 points.

Final 
The final was held on 1 October 2006. The winner was "Een tocht door het donker" performed by Thor!.

At Eurovision 
At Junior Eurovision, Belgium performed in thirteenth position, before Croatia and after Belarus. Belgium placed in 7th position with 71 points; the highest of which was 10 points, which came from Croatia.

Voting

Notes

References

External links 
 Official Belgian JESC Site

Junior Eurovision Song Contest
2006
Belgium